Oedemera nobilis, also known as the false oil beetle, thick-legged flower beetle or swollen-thighed beetle, is a beetle in the  family Oedemeridae, a common species in Western Europe, including the south of England.

Morphology
The male of Oedemera nobilis, as in most Oedemera species, possesses the hind femora very swollen, whereas in female the femora are thin; the elytra are strongly narrowed towards the apexes, not hiding the membranous hind wings. It is bright green, frequently with a golden or coppery shine; some individuals are blue or violaceous. It can only be confused with Oedemera flavipes (which does not live in the British Isles), from which it differs by its colour, as well as by the long white pubescence on the head, pronotum and hind tibiae of males.

Biology and ecology
Oedemera nobilis is abundant in spring on several flower species; the males are very conspicuous by their swollen femora and bright green colour. It feeds on pollen and nectar of Asteraceae, Cyperaceae, Convolvulaceae, Cruciferae, Dipsacaceae, Scrophulariaceae, Poaceae, Papaveraceae, Plantaginaceae, Rosaceae, Rubiaceae and Apiaceae. The larvae develop on dry stems of Spartium and Cirsium.

Distribution
Western and southern Europe, from the Iberian Peninsula to Greece; it is absolutely common in Mediterranean countries and penetrates in Central Europe to middle of Germany and British Isles; it has reached Denmark, where it is rare and sporadic. It is also recorded from the Maghreb. It is absent from alpine countries and Eastern Europe.

In England and Wales, it is presently in a markedly expansive and consolidational phase, which commenced during 1995.

Gallery

References

External links

Fauna Ibérica 
European fauna of Oedemeridae 

Oedemeridae
Beetles of Africa
Beetles of Europe
Beetles described in 1763
Taxa named by Giovanni Antonio Scopoli
Articles containing video clips